Gabriela Ortiz (born 1964) is a Mexican music educator and composer.

Biography
Gabriela Ortiz Torres was born in Mexico City of parents who were folk musicians.  She learned folk music at home, and then studied in Paris at the Ecole Normale de Musique. She returned to Mexico City due to the illness of her mother, and studied composition there with Mario Lavista at the National Conservatory of Music. She continued her studies at the Guildhall School with Robert Saxton, and with Simon Emmerson at the University of London where she received a PhD in 1996.  After completing her studies, she took a position at the National School of Music at the National Autonomous University in Mexico City. She also taught at Indiana University in the United States.

Music 
Ortiz incorporates conventional notation techniques in her compositions, which have contemporary, rock, African and Afro-Cuban influences. She has also composed pieces that incorporate experimental electro-acoustic elements.

Honors and awards
Civitella Ranieri Artistic Residency
John Simon Guggenheim Memorial Foundation Fellowship
Fulbright Fellowship
Distincion Universidad Nacional
First prize of the Silvestre Revueltas National Chamber Music Competition
First Prize at the Alicia Urreta Composition Competition
Composers Award Mexican Council for the Arts and Culture
National Artists System Fellowship from the Mexican Council for the Arts and Culture
Banff Center for the Arts Residency
Inroads Commission, a Program of Arts International with funds from the Ford Foundation
Rockefeller Foundation
Mozart Medal Award for Mexican Theatre and Music as the best composer of 1997
The Fundacion Cultural Bancomer Award

Selected works
Dance scores

 Hacia La Deriva, 1989
 Eve and All the Rest, 1991
 Errant maneuvers, 1993

Orchestral

 Patios, 1989
 Concierta candela, solo percussion and orchestra, 1993
 Altar de Neón, percussion quartet, chamber orchestra, 1995
 Zocalo-Bastilla, violin, percussion and orchestra, 1996
 Altar de Piedra, percussion and orchestra, 2003
Zocalo Tropical, flute, percussion and orchestra
100 Watts, clarinet, bassoon, piano
Seis piezas a Violeta for string quartet and piano
Baalkah for string quartet
Corporea, chamber ensemble, 2015, commissioned by San Francisco Contemporary Music Players

Opera

Unicamente La Verdad, opera 2010 libretto by Ruben Ortiz

Electro-acoustic

Magna Sin, steel drum and tape, 1992
5 Micro Etudes, tape, 1992
Things Like That Happened, cello, tape, 1994
El Trompo, vibraphone, tape, 1994
Altar de Muertos, string quartet, tape, 1996

Other works

Her compositions have been recorded and issued on CD including:

Denibée by Gabriela Ortiz, Alejandro Escuer (Audio CD - 2014)
Aroma Foliando by Gabriela Ortiz, Southwest Chamber Music (Audio CD - 2013)
Altar de Muertos by Gabriela Ortiz, Arturo Nieto-Dorantes, and Sarah Leonard (Audio CD - 2006)
Tear by Ruth Crawford Seeger, Gabriela Ortiz, Silvestre Revueltas, Adriana Isabel Figueroa Mañas, and Alberto Ginastera (Audio CD - 2003)
Visiones Panamericanas by Tania Leon, Eugenio Toussaint, Gabriela Ortiz, Roberto Sierra, and Richard Felciano (Audio CD - 2002)
Mi Chelada by Alejandro Cardona, Gabriel Ruiz, Astor Piazzolla, Miguel del Aguila, and Enrico Chapela (Audio CD - 2000)
Ritmicas by Minoru Miki, Santiago Ojeda, Gabriela Ortiz, Amadeo Roldan, and Eugenio Toussaint (Audio CD - 1997)
Musica Sinfonica Mexicana by Silvestre Revueltas, Federico Ibarra, Gabriela Ortiz, Manuel Enriquez, and Jose Pablo Moncayo Garcia (Audio CD - 1997)

References

External links
Official composer page
Composer bio and recording of Corporea San Francisco Contemporary Music Players

1964 births
Living people
20th-century classical composers
Mexican women classical composers
Mexican classical composers
Musicians from Mexico City
Alumni of the Guildhall School of Music and Drama
Alumni of the University of London
Jacobs School of Music faculty
Women music educators
21st-century classical composers
20th-century women composers
21st-century women composers
Mexican music educators